WonderWorks is an anthology series which ran from 1984 to 1992. Produced by the Public Broadcasting Service, the Walt Disney Company purchased the home video rights to the series in 1987 and was responsible for making the series available to the public on VHS and later DVD in addition to airing some of the programs on the Disney Channel. The series consisted of short, made-for-television films out of acclaimed children's books. They included adaptations of Anne of Green Gables, Bridge to Terabithia, All Summer in a Day, Jacob Have I Loved, The Box of Delights, The Chronicles of Narnia series, Miracle at Moreaux, The Hoboken Chicken Emergency (starring Peter Billingsley), Odile & Yvette at the Edge of the World (scored by Blake Leyh), How to Be a Perfect Person in Just Three Days! (by Stephen Manes), Gryphon (produced by Manuel Arce and Carl Haber, starring Amanda Plummer), A Little Princess, A Girl of the Limberlost, Sweet 15, A Waltz Through the Hills, The Canterville Ghost, Frog, The Haunting of Barney Palmer, Lone Star Kid, Caddie Woodlawn, The House of Dies Drear, and The Boy Who Loved Trolls. It also co-produced the Australian Clowning Around series.

WonderWorks also carried Traitor in My House (1990), a 50-minute film that tells the story of Elizabeth Van Lew, a Union sympathizer who lived in Richmond, Virginia during the American Civil War. The story is told through the eyes of Van Lew's 12-year-old niece, Louise Van Lew. Traitor in My House stars Mary Kay Place, Charles S. Dutton, Harris Yulin, and Angela Goethals. The film is directed by Nell Cox and was produced by the Educational Film Center. Cate Adair provided costume design.

In 1987, the show's home video rights were picked up by Walt Disney Home Video to release the episodes on videocassette.

The WonderWorks series opening intro consisted of a computer animated light bulb shaped hot air balloon with an airplane at the base of it under the name The WonderWorks BalloonPlane as the main focal point of the intro.

During the airing of later productions, the show was renamed as The WonderWorks' Family Movie up until the series' end.

The program was co-produced by WQED-Pittsburgh, KCET-Los Angeles, KTCA-St. Paul/Minneapolis, WHRO-Hampton-Norfolk/Virginia, South Carolina Educational Television, WETA-Washington, D.C. and KERA-Dallas/Fort Worth, Texas.

In 1999, rights to 55 WonderWorks specials were passed over to CINAR Corporation (now in Cookie Jar Entertainment/DHX Media), who have since sold the rights to Questar Entertainment sometime in the 2000s.

References

External links

PBS original programming
Television series by Disney
1980s American anthology television series
1990s American anthology television series